Mamadou Alimou Diallo (born 2 December 1984 in Conakry) is a Guinean former professional footballer who played as a centre-back.

External links
 TFF
 

1984 births
Living people
Sportspeople from Conakry
Guinean footballers
Association football defenders
Guinea international footballers
2006 Africa Cup of Nations players
2008 Africa Cup of Nations players
Belgian Pro League players
Süper Lig players
Satellite FC players
K.S.C. Lokeren Oost-Vlaanderen players
Sivasspor footballers
Diyarbakırspor footballers
AS Kaloum Star players
Guinean expatriate footballers
Guinean expatriate sportspeople in Turkey
Expatriate footballers in Turkey